AB Disques is a record label created by AB Productions in 1991 to release the records of their house singers. Previously, the records produced by the company were simply stamped "AB Productions" or "AB Hits". AB Disques was one of the premier independent labels in Europe in the 1990s with artists such as Dorothée and Hélène Rollès, as well as numerous actors from sitcoms produced by AB Productions.

The AB Disques catalogue, today called "Panorama AB", consists of almost 1,200 songs, nearly all of which were written and composed by Jean-Luc Azoulay and Gérard Salesses. However, in the 1970s and 1980s, AB Productions also produced celebrities such as Arielle Dombasle and Steve Gabsi.

Singers 

Dorothée
Les Musclés
Bernard Minet
Babsie Steger
Emmanuelle
Hélène Rollès
Sébastien Roch
Manuela Lopez
Christophe Rippert
Anthony Dupray
Ever and Ever
Julie Caignault
Camille Raymond
François Rocquelin
Thierry Redler
Bradley Cole
Ariane Carletti
Jacques Jakubowicz, best known as "Jacky"
François Corbier
Patrick Simpson-Jones
Jean-Paul Césari
William Leymergie
Alain Chauffour
Carlos
Chantal Goya
Dave
Claire Séverac and David Soul
Hurricane Fifi
Nadine Expert
Les Allumettes
Steve Gabsi
Alexis
Marisa
Arielle Dombasle

Mediawan Thematics
French record labels